Frederick Arthur Bridgman (November 10, 1847 – January 13, 1928) was an American artist  known for his paintings of  "Orientalist" subjects.

Life and career

Born in Tuskegee, Alabama, Bridgman was the son of a physician. He began as a draughtsman in New York City, for the American Bank Note Company in 1864–65, and studied art in the same years at the Brooklyn Art Association and at the National Academy of Design. He went to Paris in 1866, and in 1867 he entered the studio of the noted academic painter Jean-Léon Gérôme (1824–1904), where he was deeply influenced by Gérôme's precise draftsmanship, smooth finishes, and concern for Middle-Eastern themes. Thereafter, Paris became his headquarters. In 1874, he was elected into the National Academy of Design as an Associate member, and became a full member in 1881.

Bridgman made his first trip to North Africa between 1872 and 1874, dividing his time between Morocco tunisia and Algeria and Egypt. There he executed approximately three hundred sketches, which became the source material for several later oil paintings that attracted immediate attention. Bridgman became known as "the American Gérôme", although Bridgman would later adopt a more naturalistic aesthetic, emphasizing bright colors and painterly brushwork.

His large and important composition, The funeral rites of a mummy on the Nile (1876–77; Speed Art Museum, Louisville), exhibited at the Paris Salon in 1877 and Royal Academy of Arts in 1881, bought by James Gordon Bennett, Jr., brought him the Cross of the Legion of Honor. The painting was later purchased by the famous American collector Wendell Cherry who donated it to the Speed Art Museum in Louisville, Kentucky in 1990.

Additional visits to the region throughout the 1870s and 1880s allowed him to amass a collection of costumes, architectural pieces, and objets d'art, which often appear in his paintings. John Singer Sargent noted that Bridgman's overstuffed studio, along with the Eiffel Tower, were Paris's must-see attractions. Though Bridgman maintained a lifelong connection to France, his popularity in America never waned. Indeed, in 1890, the artist had a one-man show of over 400 pictures in New York's 5th Avenue galleries. When the show moved to Chicago's Art Institute, it contained only 300 works – testimony to the high number of sales Bridgman had made.

See also 
 List of Orientalist artists
 Orientalism

References
 Museum of Fine Arts Boston

Sources

Additional information gathered and paraphrased from non-copyrighted auction information published by Sotheby's Auction House.

External links
Decorative works, salon pictures, eastern subjects and drawings by Frederic A. Bridgman, a full-text auction catalog from The Metropolitan Museum of Art Libraries

1847 births
1928 deaths
People from Tuskegee, Alabama
19th-century American painters
American male painters
20th-century American painters
Pont-Aven painters
Orientalist painters
19th-century American male artists
20th-century American male artists